was a politician and businessman in late Meiji and early Taishō period Empire of Japan. He is noted for his involvement in the Siemens scandal of 1914 and in the development of the South Manchurian Railway.

Biography
Yamamoto Jōtarō was born on October 11, 1867 in Echizen Province (part of present-day Echizen, Fukui Prefecture) as the eldest son of Yamamoto Jōetsu, a samurai of the Fukui Domain. Yamamoto attended and dropped out from the Kaisei Academy.

After joining Mitsui Bussan, he worked at the Yokohama branch, Shanghai branch, Shanghai Boseki Company, and Osaka branch, rising rapidly through the corporate ranks, becoming Executive Director of Mitsui by 1909. He was forced to resign from Mitsui in 1914, after being implicated in the Siemens Bribery Scandal, a spectacular political scandal involving collusion between several high-ranking members of the Imperial Japanese Navy, Mitsui, and the German industrial conglomerate Siemens AG.

After Yamamoto resigned, he became an entrepreneur, and started several companies. He also turned his attention to politics, and ran for the House of Representatives of Japan under the Rikken Seiyūkai political party in 1920. He was reelected five consecutive times.

From 1927 to 1929, under the sponsorship of Prime Minister Tanaka Giichi, Yamamoto was made Chairman of the semi-governmental South Manchurian Railway Company, presiding over a period of successful expansion for the company. One of his first tasks was to negotiate leases to permit the building of two additional spur lines directly with Fengtian clique warlord Zhang Zuolin, circumventing the Japanese Ministry of Foreign Affairs. This act of independent diplomacy was authorized by Tanaka, who also held the portfolio of Foreign Minister as well as Prime Minister.

Yamamoto also worked closely with the Japanese Consul-General in Mukden, Shigeru Yoshida, in influencing the foreign policy of the Tanaka administration into a stronger stance to promote Japanese economic interests in northern China. However, the Huanggutun Incident, the assassination of Zhang Zuolin by agents of the Kwantung Army also occurred during his tenure, and he was forced into retirement.

His summer villa was located in Kamakura and is designated a Registered tangible cultural property (building).

Yamamoto was also known as a master of the Japanese tea ceremony, a pursuit to which he devoted his retirement years. His grave is at the Tama Cemetery in Fuchū, Tokyo.

References

References

External links

1867 births
1936 deaths
People from Echizen, Fukui
People of Meiji-period Japan
Japanese businesspeople
Japanese tea masters
Rikken Seiyūkai politicians
Members of the House of Representatives (Empire of Japan)
Kaisei Academy alumni